Aleksandr Golovin may refer to:

 Aleksandr Golovin (artist) (1863–1930), Russian artist and stage designer
 Alexander Vasiliyevich Golovin (born 1949), Russian diplomat and ambassador
 Aleksandr Golovin (footballer) (born 1996), Russian football player
 Alexander Golovin (ice hockey) (born 1983), Russian ice hockey player
 Aleksandr Golovin (wrestler) (born 1995), Russian Greco-Roman junior wrestler, silver world cup